The Independent Democratic Party of Russia (НДПР, IDPR or NDPR) was the proposed name of a liberal party that was announced in late September 2008 to be founded by the former General Secretary of the Soviet Union, Mikhail Gorbachev, and State Duma deputy of Fair Russia, Alexander Lebedev. The Union of Social Democrats, led by Mikhail Gorbachev, is said to be its main base. 
Lebedev also stressed that the "party will press for legal and economic reform and promote the growth of independent media" as well as "less state capitalism", a reform of the justice system, and a stronger role of the parliament. At some point between 2014 and 2016, the website associated with the proposed party went offline.

References

External links
Official website of the proposed party

Liberal parties in Russia
Mikhail Gorbachev
Political parties established in 2008